Anis al-Dawla (died 1896) was a royal consort of shah Naser al-Din Shah Qajar of Persia (r. 1848–1896).

Life
She was the daughter of an impoverished shepherd in a from Amamme village in Lavāsān, northeast of Tehran, and was employed as a free maidservant to Jeyran (wife of Naser al-Din Shah) in the Qajar harem in 1859. She became the favorite of the shah after Jeyrān's death in 1860.

She was the only wife to take meals with Nāṣer-al-dīn and to join him regularly at bedtime after he received visits from other wives; she was also the only one to openly criticize him. While the shah' had other favorites, such as her own servant Amina Aqdas, she remained his main favorite.

She had a great desire to visit the West. In 1873, she did accompany the Shah on his visit to Moscow; however, she was forced to interrupt the visit and return after it became apparent that the host governments was not able to manage the protocol around secluded veiled women. She blamed prime minister Mirza Hosein Khan Moshir od-Dowleh, for her interrupted journey, and managed to have him deposed from his post.

In the harem, she took precedence over all other eighty-five wives. She took over the duties by the shah's mother Malek Jahan Khanom after her death in 1873, and was given revenue from districts rather than a salary like the other women. She received the wives of heads of foreign legations and visiting dignitaries. Her influence over the shah resulted in her being given a lot appeals from supplicants.

References

1896 deaths
Qajar royal consorts
19th-century Iranian women